Margaret Brenman-Gibson (1918–2004) was an American psychologist, among the first to use of hypnosis in the treatment of neurosis resulting from war and related areas. She was the first non-physician to receive full clinical and research psychoanalytic training in America. In 1982 she was one of the first women to receive a Harvard professorship as Clinical Professor of Psychology. She earned a Masters in Anthropology from Columbia University and a doctorate in Psychology from the University of Kansas. She was the only female psychotherapist on the staff at the Austen Riggs Center and was recognized as a notable member of staff at the organization's centenary anniversary, playing a key role in the organization's establishment as a leading psychiatric hospital and treatment center. Her other work includes a biography of Clifford Odets, and narration of the film Erik Erikson: A Life’s Work.  She was married to the playwright William Gibson from 1940 until her death  in 2004.

References 

Columbia Graduate School of Arts and Sciences alumni
Harvard University faculty
University of Kansas alumni
American psychotherapists
1918 births
2004 deaths